Colorado Springs Business Journal, founded in 1989, is a weekly business periodical for Colorado Springs, Colorado.

History
Chuck Shelden and Roger Powell founded the Colorado Springs Business Journal on April 1, 1989. Its first office was in the DeGraff Building on S. Tejon and it was first a twice a month publication. By 1993 it had become a weekly publication, had 15 staff members and moved to 31 E. Platte Avenue. In 1998 Shelden and Powell sold the journal to the Dolan Media Group, which is based in Minneapolis, Minnesota and also published the Colorado Springs Military Newspaper Group. As reported in 2005 and 2010, there were 20 people on staff. In 2012, the Business Journal was sold by Dolan to the Colorado Springs Independent. Colorado Publishing Company. Its revenue was below $5 million in 2005 and above $5 million in 2010.

Overview
It is one of four major print media in Colorado Springs. The others are The Gazette, Colorado Springs Independent (the Independent), and The Employment News.

It is the city's primary source of business information and news, covering health care industries, tourism, finance, real estate, retailing, wholesaling, management, technology, law, communications and transportation. Special sections include Best of Springs Business, Rising Stars, Book of Lists and Women of Influence. It is one of the city's named resources for new and existing businesses.

It has been Better Business Bureau accredited since March 24, 2000. As of June, 2013, it had an A+ rating.

References

External links
 Colorado Springs Business Journal (official site)

Mass media in Colorado Springs, Colorado
Business newspapers published in the United States
Companies based in Colorado Springs, Colorado
Weekly newspapers published in the United States
Newspapers established in 1989
1989 establishments in Colorado